Washington Township is one of the twelve townships of Preble County, Ohio, United States.  The 2000 census found 2,104 people in the township.

Geography
Located in the north central part of the county, it borders the following townships:
Monroe Township - north
Harrison Township - northeast corner
Twin Township - east
Lanier Township - southeast
Gasper Township - south
Dixon Township - southwest
Jackson Township - west
Jefferson Township - northwest corner

The city of Eaton, the county seat of Preble County, is located in central Washington Township.

Name and history
Washington Township was organized in 1809, and named for President George Washington. It is one of forty-three Washington Townships statewide.

Government
The township is governed by a three-member board of trustees, who are elected in November of odd-numbered years to a four-year term beginning on the following January 1. Two are elected in the year after the presidential election and one is elected in the year before it. There is also an elected township fiscal officer, who serves a four-year term beginning on April 1 of the year after the election, which is held in November of the year before the presidential election. Vacancies in the fiscal officership or on the board of trustees are filled by the remaining trustees.

References

External links
County website

Townships in Preble County, Ohio
Townships in Ohio